Oreta eminens is a species of moth of the family Drepanidae first described by Felix Bryk in 1943. It is found in Myanmar, China (Zhejiang, Jiangxi, Hunan, Fujian, Guangxi, Sichuan, Chongqing, Yunnan), Korea and Japan.

References

External links
Swedish Museum of Natural History: image of type specimen

Moths described in 1943
Drepaninae